Zonalnoye was founded on January 20, 1992 and is an airline based in Tymovskoye (Sakhalin Oblast) of Russia which specialises in the transportation and storage of petroleum and related equipment. Zonalnoye also engages in the wholesale of fuel

Fleet

Criminal liability

On 26 March 2012, the head of Zonalnoye was subject to criminal liability (by Yegor Korczak, the Sakhalin transport prosecutor) for regularly carrying passengers in an Mi-2 helicopter in 2011 without a passenger license. The company made 75 passenger flights in that year, carrying 1007 passengers on the routes:

 Alexandrovsk-Sakhalinsky - Trambaus - Viahtu - Alexandrovsk-Sakhalinsky
 Okha - Rybnovskij - Okha

The airline was also fined 40,000 Roubles.

References

Defunct airlines of Russia
Companies based in Sakhalin Oblast